Mehran Kardar (August 1957) is an Iranian born physicist and professor of physics at the Massachusetts Institute of Technology (MIT), and co-faculty at the New England Complex Systems Institute (USA). He received his B.A. in physics from the University of Cambridge in 1979, and obtained his Ph.D. from MIT in 1983. Kardar is particularly known for the Kardar–Parisi–Zhang (KPZ) equation in theoretical physics, which has been named after him and collaborators. He was awarded a Guggenheim Fellowship in 2001.

Awards
1976–78 Exhibition – Senior Scholarship at King's College, Cambridge University
1978–79 Prizes based on performance in undergraduate (Tripos) exams
1981–82 IBM Predoctoral Fellowship
1983–86 Junior Fellowship, Harvard Society of Fellows
1987–91 A. P. Sloan Fellowship
1988 Fellow of Ashdown House (Graduate Dormitory), MIT
1988 Bergmann Memorial Research Award
1989 Presidential Young Investigator Award
1990 Graduate Student Departmental Teaching Award
1990–92 MIT Class of 1948 Professor (Career Development Chair)
1991 Edgerton Award for Junior Faculty Achievements at MIT
1992 The Beuchner Teaching Prize, Physics Department
1993 School of Science Prize in Graduate Teaching
2001 John Simon Guggenheim Fellowship
2007 Fellow, American Physical Society
2008 School of Science Prize in Graduate Teaching
2009 APS Outstanding Referee
2009 Elected Fellow of the American Academy of Arts and Sciences
2011 Francis Freidman Professor, Physics Department, MIT
2018 Elected member of the National Academy of Sciences
2020 Simons Fellow in Mathematics and Theoretical Physics

Courses at MIT OpenCourseWare 
His following courses are currently available on MIT OCW.
Statistical Physics in Biology
Statistical Mechanics I: Statistical Mechanics of Particles
Statistical Mechanics II: Statistical Physics of Fields

Bibliography

Books 
Statistical Physics of Fields. University of Cambridge Press, 2007. ,
Statistical Physics of Particles. University of Cambridge Press, 2007. ,
and of about 200 scientific papers

References

External links
His homepage on the MIT website
His homepage on the NECSI website

1957 births
Iranian physicists
MIT Department of Physics alumni
Iranian emigrants to the United States
Harvard Fellows
Massachusetts Institute of Technology School of Science faculty
Year of birth missing (living people)
Living people
Iranian expatriate academics
New England Complex Systems Institute
Members of the United States National Academy of Sciences
Fellows of the American Physical Society